The 201 Squadron of the Israeli Air Force, also known as The One, is an F-16I fighter squadron based at Ramon Airbase.

See also
Operation Priha
Operation Doogman 5

References

Israeli Air Force squadrons
Military units and formations established in 1969